On 19 July 2016, a shooting occurred at the Castle Sports Complex in the town centre of Spalding in Lincolnshire, United Kingdom.  Three people, including the perpetrator, were killed in the shooting.

Police quickly ruled out potential links to terrorism, while stating that the incident appeared to be a lone wolf attack. 

Though not officially a "mass shooting" attack, the incident was the deadliest shooting in the United Kingdom since the Horden shooting in January 2012, in which four people were killed.

Shooting
At around 09:00 BST on 19 July 2016, a single gunman, 57-year-old builders merchant Lance Hart, opened fire close to the entrance to the swimming pool at the Castle Sports Complex in Spalding town centre, using a single-barreled shotgun.

The perpetrator purposefully targeted the two present members of his family; 50-year-old Claire Hart, who was shot in the chest and abdomen, and their daughter, 19-year-old Charlotte Hart, who was shot in her upper abdomen. Both victims suffered fatally wounding gunshot injuries before the shooter turned the firearm upon himself, killing himself instantly with a self-inflicted gunshot wound to the head, at the scene of the attack.

Local residents said that they heard "three bangs" in the area at around the time of the attack.

Aftermath
The East Midlands Ambulance Service responded to the shooting and treated three people with gunshot wounds, but were unable to resuscitate them. The local air ambulance attended the incident. Due to initial fears of potential further attackers, paramedics were told to approach the scene with caution, while police stepped up patrols across Spalding.

Following the shooting, Lincolnshire Police raided a house in Hatt Close in the village of Moulton, five miles from the site of the attack in Spalding town centre. Police also confirmed that the incident was not terrorism-related and no shots were fired at, or by, police officers. They also confirmed that they were not looking for any further suspects in connection with the shooting, before asking for any potential witnesses to come forward. At least six police cars attended the incident, with some eyewitnesses stating that they saw "dozens" of police vehicles following the shooting. The attack was later confirmed to be unrelated to an ongoing gang conflict amongst Eastern European immigrants in Lincolnshire, which has been the cause of previous firearms incidents in the area.

The Castle Sports Complex was closed as a result of the shooting. Parts of Spalding town centre were also cordoned off, while Pinchbeck Road through the town was closed. Local businesses were warned by police to keep their doors locked. Local schools were initially put under lockdown due to fears of potential further attacks. The lockdown was lifted by 12:00 on the day of the shooting. Counselling support was offered to staff at the Castle Sports Complex following the shooting.

Reactions
Jeremy Corbyn, leader of the Labour Party at the time, tweeted his condolences following the shooting, stating: "Shocking events in Spalding, Lincolnshire. My thoughts are with the victims and their families". The leader of Lincolnshire County Council, Martin Hill, stated that he was "shocked" by the shooting.

Councillor Gary Taylor, South Holland District Council's representative for the Spalding Castle ward in which the attack took place, stated that "it's terrible news and local people are very shocked". Additionally, he stated that "gun crime does not exist in this area at all".

On Twitter, the Diocese of Lincoln stated that their "thoughts and prayers are with the community of Spalding at this time".

Tributes were left outside the Hart family home in Moulton, Lincolnshire by local residents following the shooting. Further tributes were left at the local church, where mourners lit candles.

Inquest
The inquest had found that the shooting took place due to a prolonged domestic situation leading to marital breakdown, and the subsequent shooting. 

The perpetrator, Lance Hart, was described as both a "very difficult man" with a "short fuse" and as a "very nice guy" who was "always caring" by some of the people who knew him. Hart had previously lived in Wisbech, but moved after he purportedly "fell out with everyone", and his sons described their father, Lance Hart, as a "tyrant", who inflicted constant psychological abuse on the family.

The coroner was told Mrs Hart, had left her home in Moulton on 14 July, which the perpetrator was not aware of at the time. She reportedly remarked to an onlooking neighbour that, "[...] He'll have a surprise when he gets home tonight. I've put up with enough for the past 15, 16 years." Det Inspector Helen Evans said Mrs Hart had told a colleague that "she had become worn out by Lance's behaviour", and described him as being a "controlling and selfish man,". Mrs Hart was described as "beaming and really happy" in the few days that had elapsed since leaving her husband.

On the day of the shooting, the couple arranged to meet to exchange documents and photographs, when the assailant had planned the coinciding shooting to take place at matter of convenience to access his targeted victims.

It emerged during the investigation that a single memory stick had been found in Mr Hart's parked vehicle, carrying a document of what he intend to do, in which he had written: "Revenge is a dish served cold." Hart had also previously threatened a neighbour in Spalding with the firearm in question following a minor dispute over a planning application. As well as this, police confirmed that the suspected gunman did not have a valid firearms licence for the used shotgun, and had obtained the firearm through illegal means.

See also
List of massacres in Great Britain

References

Attacks in the United Kingdom in 2016
2016 in England
2010s in Lincolnshire
Crime in Lincolnshire
Familicides
July 2016 crimes in Europe
July 2016 events in the United Kingdom
Murder in England
Murder–suicides in the United Kingdom
2016